Oja may refer to:
 Oja (river), river in La Rioja, Spain
 Oja (surname), an Estonian and Finnish surname
 5080 Oja, main-belt asteroid
 Ōja Station, railway station in Hashikami, Japan
 Oja's rule, a model of properties of neurons in the brain
 "Oja", a 2019 song by Reminisce
 Ọjà, musical instrument of the Igbo people

See also 
 Öja (disambiguation)
 OJA (disambiguation)
 Oya (disambiguation)